Seabrook is an unincorporated community in Liberty County, in the U.S. state of Georgia.

History
Seabrook was originally built up chiefly by former slaves, and named for a nearby brook which empties into the sea. A post office called Seabrook was established in 1895, and remained in operation until 1917.

References

Unincorporated communities in Georgia (U.S. state)
Unincorporated communities in Liberty County, Georgia